Federico Galera Díez (born 11 February 1978) is a Spanish ski mountaineer and mountain runner.

Galera  was born in Madrid. He started ski mountaineering in 1996 and competed first in the same year. His twin brother Carlos is also a ski mountaineer.

Selected results

Ski mountaineering 
He won two European "espoirs" class  champion titles, was Spanish champion and winner of a Spanish Cup in the same class. In 1998 he became a member of the national ski mountaineering team, was three times Spanish Cup winner and four times Spanish champion in the "seniors" class.

 2001:
 9th, European Championship team race (together with his brother Carlos)
 2006:
 6th, World Championship relay race (together with Javier Martín de Villa, Manuel Pérez Brunicardi and Agustí Roc Amador

Patrouille des Glaciers 

 2000: 6th ("seniors I" class ranking), together with Manuel Pérez Brunicardi and Jorge Palacio Sanz
 2010: 9th ("seniors II" class ranking), together with Carlos Galera Díez and Francisco Javier Rodriguez Bodas

Mountain running 
 1st, Cross Alpino del Telégrafo

External links 
 Federico Galera at skimountaineering.org

References 

1978 births
Living people
Spanish male ski mountaineers
Athletes from Madrid
Spanish male mountain runners
Twin sportspeople
Spanish twins